Tony Considine served as manager of the Clare senior hurling team from November 2006 until August 2007.

Considine was ratified as the Clare hurling manager to succeed Anthony Daly in November 2006 at a county board meeting in Ennis.  He had previously served as a selector on the successful Clare all-Ireland junior winning team of 1993 under Scariff man Mike McNamara.  At senior level he was also part of Ger Loughnane's backroom team (along with McNamara) that guided Clare hurling to its most enduring and success-laden period between 1995 and 1998.  Clare ended a 63-year wait to win the Munster title and 81-year wait to lay claim to the all-Ireland senior championship title in 1995.

The new incumbent had drawn the ire of certain GAA followers in Clare in October 2006 when he outlined his dismay and frustration on local radio in Clare that his close friend Ger Loughnane had accepted the role of the Galway senior management role urging Clare Gaelic Athletic Association leaders to stop talented gaa people leaving Clare.

Shortly after this juncture Considine was approached to take over the role of the vacant Clare manager's role which had been previously held by the hugely popular Anthony Daly who subsequently went on in 2007 to become a respected Gaelic games pundit on national television. 

The new Clare manager, a native of Cratloe in south east Clare drew some satisfaction from the club delegates by announcing he would allow the county players to play for their clubs during the summer, something that had been essentially prevented by prior Clare managers over a twelve-year period.

Role with Clare ends 

His reign as manager of the  'Banner' county hurlers was shrouded in controversy for most of his tenure and it came as little surprise when he was overwhelmingly dismissed from his role on 14 August 2007 at the meeting of the Clare county board.

A series of events throughout most of 2007 brought great controversy upon Considine and club delegates in Clare voted 45 to 6 to remove the management from their roles at the August board meeting of Clare gaa.

Many Controversies 

His appointment did not please all grassroots followers in Clare Gaelic games as it was perceived by many that his appointment had been rushed through without due process by the county board officials and the consideration of other candidates.

Considine had spent a number of years as a controversial and very earnest pundit with the Irish Examiner newspaper where his critical viewpoint did not always draw the appreciation of players. 

Upon his ratification as the manager at the meeting in November 2006 of the 'Banner' county he announced his backroom team of Tim Crowe, Ciaran O'Neill, Ger Ward, former Clare hurler and successful club coach Pat O'Connor and fitness coach and former Limerick trainer Dave Mahedy as his colleagues in the Clare senior hurling management.

A mere six weeks after securing the services of the highly respected Mahedy it emerged that the ex-Limerick gaa and league of Ireland soccer physical trainer had decided to leave the Clare training set-up much to the disbelief of Clare followers.

Tony Considine explained that Mahedy was only able to commit to a six-week period and consultancy role despite previous announcements that he would be a full-time member of the backroom team.

In the early season at the Waterford Crystal tournament it was reported that the Clare management had asked a medical officer and county sponsor Pat O'Donnell to leave the team's dressing room prior to their meeting with Tipperary.

In February respected Clarecastle man Ger Ward stood down from his role as Clare selector after issuing a letter to the county board meeting outlying essential differences of opinion with the manager and was widely noted by many in the local media that he did not travel to Clare's opening competitive appearance of the year when running out easy winners over Down in Portaferry in the national league. 

It subsequently emerged that Tony Considine failed to meet Ger Ward for a second proposed meeting in Ennis to discuss their issues. This incensed the Clarecastle club and further damaged the position of the under-fire manager.

It was alleged that Ger Ward had great issues over the reported treatment of certain players most notably Davy Fitzgerald a three time all-star recipient and two time all-Ireland winner within the Clare camp.

Mere weeks before Clare's championship clash with Cork in a stunning turn of events the Clare manager had to survive an attempted vote of no confidence at a county board meeting. However the vote did not get off the ground for debate as a motion.

It sparked senior members of the Clare panel to defend their manager and to call for people to allow the manager and players to get on with their role in trying to be successful.

Davy Fitzgerald saga 

The undoubtedly shocking decision of veteran goalkeeper Davy Fitzgerald to walk away from the Clare panel a mere three weeks into the tenure of Tony Considine, has been in the view of many as the defining and decisive moment in Considine's brief role as Clare manager.

The withdrawal from the Clare panel of the celebrated seventeen-year veteran goalkeeper reported in January 2007 over an alleged disagreement between the pair, was believed to have revolved around the squad's intense training preparation and techniques.

This news set in motion a position from which from Tony Considine would ultimately not recover and despite Fitzgerald not speaking on the matter publicly, it had and would prove a constant millstone around Considine's neck.

Tulla goalkeeper Philip Brennan became Clare's number one in 2007 and enjoyed a solid year as the Banner custodian in the absence of the three time all-star winner Fitzgerald. 

Added to that controversy the withdrawal of the hugely talented forward Tony Carmody from the panel in the middle of the national hurling league was another significant blow to the county team and its supporters.

An explanation as to why Carmody an all-star nominee decided to leave the set-up had in many eyes not been properly explained by the manager or the county board.

Clare's most influential forward Tony Griffen an all-star winner in 2006 decided to undertake a mammoth cycle across both Ireland and Canada to raise funds for the cure for Cancer in the wake of the death of his father from the disease between February and June 2007 meant Clare were shorn the service of another outstanding attacking player.

Prior to the start of the Munster championship clash with Cork at Semple Stadium on 27 May, a number of players from both the Clare and Cork teams burst onto the field to engage in a pre match scuffle to the disbelief of the crowd at the venue.

Subjected to huge media scrutiny and vociferous condemnation from the GAA and media commentators both Clare and Cork were issued with one month bans to four players.

The media criticism of the events in the wake of the events at Semple Stadium was severe and drew more controversy on Clare with the loss of established players.

On the field performance 

The Clare senior hurling team endured a poor 2007 failing to qualify for the quarter-finals of the Allianz National Hurling League. The division 1A campaign saw defeats to Wexford and Cork with the home win over Waterford the subsequent League and Munster champions the only highlight of a drab campaign.

On 27 May 2007 the Clare side lost by seven points to a more decisive and talented Cork in the Munster championship opening round game at Semple Stadium in Thurles, County Tipperary on a scoreline of 1–18 to 1–11.

The pre-match scuffle between these sides resulted in Clare eventually handed one month bans to Colin Lynch, Alan Markham, Andrew Quinn and Barry Nugent.

The Clare manager subsequently saw his side draw Laois, Antrim and Galway in the back-door qualifiers, which affords previously beaten teams in the championship another chance to prove themselves in the hurling championship series.

In Clare hurling's most glorious era when three Munster titles and two all-Ireland titles were secured between 1995 and 1998, Tony Considine served as selector to Ger Loughnane the Clare manager of the time.

Ger Loughnane was announced as Galway manager at the end of 2006 and the draw which pitted Clare his former team, against his new Galway charges drew huge interest and a large crowd to Cusack Park, Ennis on 7 July 2007 in the second of the backdoor qualifiers. Indeed, the official declaration of an attendance of 14,000 drew laughter from many sections of the Ennis crowd that seemed much closer to 20,000 as they awaited the return of Ger Loughnane against his native county.

However a poor match ensued with Clare narrowly defeating Galway by 2–10 to 0–14 thanks to a goal in each half, first from Declan O'Rourke and in the second half from Niall Gilligan, which proved the difference between the two sides.

Previously Clare defeated Antrim at Casement park and following an unconvincing final qualifier win over Laois at O'Moore park in Portlaoise, Clare emerged top of group A to qualify for the quarter-final of the all-Ireland.

Clare were drawn to face 2007's surprise packages Limerick, the Munster finalists who had drawn huge praise following their enduring three game series with Tipperary in the Munster championship.

On 29 July 2007,Tony Considine served his final game in charge of Clare as their near neighbours Limerick proved far too strong to end the Clare team's championship hopes with Andrew O'Shaughnessy proving his credentials in the Limerick attack as one of the game's bright new talents to inspire Richie Bennis's side to an all-Ireland semi-final appearance against Waterford. Limerick defeating Clare.

which Limerick eventually won after a classic encounter to reach the all-Ireland final against current champions Kilkenny.

Limerick's passion, work ethic and team spirit in contrast to Clare who fielded Gerry Quinn at centre half-back despite carrying a very serious knee injury picked up against Galway in the qualifiers.

Post sacking 

Tony Considine outlined to a number of media outlets that he was not officially told of his removal from the job in the wake of his and his backroom team's dismissal.

Clare's initial back room team of six was halved prior to the county board meeting on 14 August when Tubber man Pat O'Connor stepped down from his role.

Considine outlined his disappointment at the manner of his dismissal by likening members of the Clare county board to the 'mafia' clearly displaying his disappointment at the news.

Its widely expected and speculated that Tony Considine will resume his work as a hurling media pundit in the near future although this has not been substantiated by the outgoing Clare manager.

Considine previously guided the Limerick club Garryspillane to their solitary county senior title in 2005 and could prove a catalyst as a means of a return to the role of a hurling team manager.

The Clare county board have confirmed their intention to fill the vacant Clare role swiftly with Considine's former selector Ger Ward and former Clare hurler and selector Alan Cunningham early favourites for the role.

Davy Fitzgerald has been reported as ruling himself out of contention for the role despite his strong track record of success with Limerick third level facility LIT, native club Sixmilebridge as well as a host of club teams all over Ireland.

References 

Year of birth missing (living people)
Living people
Hurling managers